Penninga's Molen or De Jonge Wester is a smock mill in Joure, Friesland, Netherlands which was built in 1900 and is working for trade. It is also used as a training mill. The mill is listed as a Rijksmonument, number 20842.

History

The mill was originally built in 1692 at Westzaan, North Holland by millwright Jelis Hendricksz. At Westzaan, it was originally a paper mill known as De Jong Dolfijn ( or De Koperen Berg (. In 1819, the mill was converted to a barley mill, later also being used for milling rice. In 1900, the mill was sold for demolition. It was dismantled and shipped across the Zuiderzee to Joure by millwright Jelmer Visser of Heerenveen. The mill had been bought by miller Auke Sietzes Penninga to replace the smock mill De Westenberg, which had burnt down on 13 April 1900. The new mill was named De Jonge Wester but was known locally as Penninga's Molen. It worked until 1936, or 1938. It is said to have been worked occasionally during the Second World War, but was otherwise used as stables. By the 1960s, the mill was derelict. The Stichting de Penninga's Molen was established in 1966. It purchased Penninga's Molen in 1970 for ƒ1. In 1970–71, the mill was restored by millwright Y Schakel of Exmorra. During the restoration, the windshaft from the Rijperpoldermolen, Ryptsjerk was fitted. This mill had burnt down on 2 June 1968. The windshaft originally in Penninga's Molen is now fitted to Sint Annamolen, Nijmegen, Gelderland. The mill was officially opened on 10 May 1972 by Commissioner to the Queen H Rijpstra. The mill serves as a training mill for the Gild Fryske Mounders (. On 7 July 2000, the mill was dressed overall in the Zaanse style, in celebration of its Zaan origins and the centenary of its erection in Joure.
A further restoration of the mill was undertaken in 2007. The stage was rebuilt, and the cap removed from the mill to allow it to be completely rethatched.

Description

Penninga's Molen is what the Dutch describe as a "stellingmolen" . It is a three-storey smock mill on a three-storey base. The bottom storey of the base is of brick, with the upper two storeys being a wood-framed structure. The smock and cap are thatched. The mill is winded by tailpole and winch. The sails are Common sails. The sails are carried on a cast-iron windshaft, which was cast by De Munck Keizer of Martenshoek, Groningen. The windshaft also carries the brake wheel, which has 53 cogs. This drives the wallower (30 cogs) at  the top of the upright shaft. At the bottom of the upright shaft, the great spur wheel, which has 133 cogs. The great spur wheel drives two pairs of   diameter Cullen millstones via lantern pinion stone nuts which has 29 staves each. A pair of  diameter French Burr millstones is driven via a lantern pinion stone nut which has 29 staves.

Millers
Auke Sietzes Penninga (1900-36 or 38)

References for above:-

Public access

Penninga's Molen is open to the public on Saturdays between 09:00 and 12:00 and at other times by appointment.

References

Windmills in Friesland
Windmills completed in 1900
Smock mills in the Netherlands
Rijksmonuments in Friesland
Octagonal buildings in the Netherlands